Mariana Lourenço Magalhães (born 4 June 2004) is a Luxembourger footballer who plays as a defender for Dames Ligue 1 club Young Boys Diekirch and the Luxembourg women's national team.

International career
Lourenco Magalhães made her senior debut for Luxembourg on 22 October 2021 during a 0–5 2023 World Cup qualifying loss against Austria.

Personal life
Mariana has a twin sister, Joana, who plays alongside her at club level, and also has been capped by Luxembourg.

References

2004 births
Living people
Women's association football defenders
Luxembourgian women's footballers
Luxembourg women's international footballers
Luxembourgian people of Portuguese descent